Greatest Hits is a compilation album by Nigerian duo P-Square. It was released on 5 May 2013, by Square Records. The album is composed of "No One Like You", "Do Me", "Chop My Money", "Beautiful Onyinye", "E No Easy", "Danger", "Ifunanya", "Temptation", "Bizzy Body" and "Alingo".

Singles
The album's only single "Alingo" was released on 15 August 2012. The song was also released as the lead single from the duo's sixth studio album, Double Trouble (2014). "Alingo" peaked at number 1 on MTV Base's  Official Naija Top 10 Chart from 22 March through 28 March 2013, surpassing 2 Face Idibia's "Ihe Neme". It also peaked at number 1 on Afribiz's Top 100 chart. The duo recorded the song prior to the Love AfroBeats Festival, which occurred at the HMV Apollo in London.

Track listing

Personnel

Peter Okoye – primary artist
Paul Okoye  – primary artist
Aituaje Iruobe – featured artist
Tiwatope Savage – featured artist
Aliaune Thiam – featured artist
Munachi Abii – featured artist
Eva Alordiah – featured artist
Akinmayokun Awodumila – featured artist
Martins Okey Justice – featured artist
Jude Engees Okoye – music video director

Release history

References

2013 compilation albums
P-Square albums
Igbo-language albums